Cnaphalocrocis limbalis is a moth of the family Crambidae described by Alfred Ernest Wileman in 1911. It is found in Taiwan and Japan.

The wingspan is 16–17 mm. Adults are on wing in February.

References

Moths described in 1911
Spilomelinae